Associação Olímpica de Itabaiana, commonly known as Itabaiana, is a Brazilian professional association football club based in Itabaiana, Sergipe. The team plays in Série D, the fourth tier of the Brazilian football league system, as well as in the Campeonato Sergipano, the top tier of the Sergipe state football league.

They competed in the Série A five times.

Itabaiana is the second-best ranked team from Sergipe in CBF's national club ranking, behind Confiança. They are also the best placed team in the state from outside of Greater Aracaju, at 85th overall.

History 
Itabaiana were founded on July 10, 1938, after Botafogo Sport Club folded. The club competed in the Série A in 1974, 1979, 1980, 1981 and 1982.

Stadium 
Itabaiana play their home games at Estádio Etelvino Mendonça. The stadium has a maximum capacity of 14,123 people. It was inaugurated on March 5, 1971, in a game against Grêmio.

Colors 
 Home: shirt with blue, white and red vertical stripes, blue shorts and blue socks.
 Away: white shirt with horizontal bands in red and blue, white shorts and white socks.

Achievements 
 Taça Nordeste:
 Winners (1): 1971
 Campeonato Sergipano:
 Winners (10): 1969, 1973, 1978, 1979, 1980, 1981, 1982, 1997, 2005, 2012
 Copa Governo do Estado de Sergipe:
 Winners (2): 2006, 2007

Current squad 
As of January 30, 2009

References

External links 
 

 
Football clubs in Sergipe
Association football clubs established in 1938
1938 establishments in Brazil